The Mexican Pavilion from the Ibero-American Exposition of 1929 is located on Avenida de la Palmera in Seville, next to the Brazilian Pavilion, and today hosts a branch of the University of Seville.

History 
Its construction took place on a 5.442 km² piece of ground ceded in 1926, while labor was in charge of the Mexican Secretary of Industry, Commerce and Labour, directed by Luis N. Morones. Its architect was Manuel María Amábilis Domínguez, from Mérida, Yucatán, who proposed the project named "ITZA" in collaboration with two Yucatecan artists that he had met in Paris, Leopoldo Tommasi López (in charge of the sculptures) and Víctor Manuel Reyes (in charge of the drawings). The building is inspired on Mesoamerican architecture; specifically the Maya architectural style known as Puuc and the Toltec-influenced style of Chichen Itza, both found in Yucatán. The construction began at the beginning of 1927 and ended on August 1928, despite having undergone some renovations in its interior. On its facade appear some reliefs with allegories and sculptures, and by the time of the exposition the interior was very profusely decorated and packed with craft objects. The building also has a backyard with a fountain decorated with Maya and Toltec motives.

Gallery

References 
 Juan José Cabrero Nieves. «Pabellón de Méjico». Cabrero, J. (2010, 04). Pabellón de Méjico. Exposición Ibero-Americana de Sevilla 1929. Visited 10, 2016, from http://exposicioniberoamericanadesevilla1929.blogspot.mx/2010/04/pabellon-de-mejico.html
 Sevilla Siglo XX (25 de octubre de 2007). «Pabellón de México».

Architecture in Mexico
Pavilions
Buildings and structures completed in 1928
World's fair architecture in Seville
Mayan_Revival_architecture